Events from the year 2007 in Russia.

Incumbents

 President - Vladimir Putin
 Prime Minister - Mikhail Fradkov to September 14, Viktor Zubkov

Events

 January 1: The Evenk and Taymyr Autonomous Okrugs merged with Krasnoyarsk Krai, ending their status as federal subjects.
 January 8: The Russia-Belarus energy dispute escalates.
 February 2: Orange Snow fell in Siberia,  most likely caused by sandstorms in neighboring Kazakhstan.
 March 17: UTair Flight 471 ends with a hard landing, killing at least 6 people and injuring 20 others.
 March 19: The Ulyanovskaya Mine disaster, a methane explosion Kemerovo Oblast, kills at least 108 people.
 April: It is reported in Forbes magazine, an American publication, that Russia now has 60 billionaires, mostly living in Moscow, which is believed to have more millionaires than any other city in the world. 15 years ago, Russia did not even have any millionaires.
 April 27: A Mil Mi-8 helicopter crashes in Chechnya, killing all 20 federal troops aboard.
 July 1: The Koryak Autonomous Okrug merged with Kamchatka Oblast, creating Kamchatka Krai.
 July 4: The International Olympic Committee awards the 2014 Winter Olympics to, Sochi, Russia.
 July 10 – August 4: The Arktika 2007 expedition commences, which is the first crewed descent to the ocean bottom at the North Pole.
 Summer: The Dissenters March, which began in December 2006, continue throughout the summer.
 September 7: Russian personnel are ambushed in the Vedeno region of Chechnya.
 November 15: The Guerilla phase of the Second Chechen War continues.
 November 24: Anti-Putin Protests, led by former world chess champion Garry Kasparov, erupted in Saint Petersburg and Moscow.
 December 2: A Chechen constitutional referendum was held in Chechnya.
 December 2: The Legislative elections for seats in the State Duma resulted in a majority win by United Russia.

Popular culture

Sports 

 January 27 – February 4: The Bandy World Championships, the sport competition for Bandy, began in Kemerovo.
 April 21 – September 23: The Russian Championship XVII, a tournament for semi-professional rugby league clubs, began.
 April 27 – May 13: The 71st IIHF World Championship sponsored by International Ice Hockey Federation was held in Moscow.
 August 19 – August 26: The Women's European Water Polo Olympic Qualifier for the 2008 Summer Olympics was held in Kirishi.
 September 28 – October 7: The World Fencing Championships were held in Saint Petersburg.
 November 21: The Russian football season ends, with the national football team winning 5 out of 10 games.
 November 22–25: The Cup of Russia, an international figure skating competition, began in Moscow.

Arts 
 March 1 – 5: The 12th Open Russian Festival of Animated Film is held, with the Grand Prix award given to My Love.
 May 10 – 12: Russia's entry to the Eurovision Song Contest, held in Finland, "Song Number 1", comes in third.

Notable births
Adeliia Petrosian

Notable deaths

January

 January 9 – Yelena Petushkova, 66, Russian equestrian, double medallist at the 1972 Olympics, after long illness.
 January 19 – Murat Nasyrov, 37, Russian pop singer of Uyghur ethnicity, committed suicide.

April

 April 23 – Boris Yeltsin, 76, Russian politician, first President of the Russian Federation (1991–1999), heart failure. 
 April 27 – Mstislav Rostropovich, cellist and conductor (born 1927)

November

 November 2 – Igor Moiseyev, 101, Russian choreographer, heart failure.
 November 3 – Aleksandr Dedyushko, 45, Russian actor, car crash.
 November 23 – Vladimir Kryuchkov, 83, Russian former KGB chief, led coup against Mikhail Gorbachev.

See also
List of Russian films of 2007

References

External links

 
Years of the 21st century in Russia
2000s in Russia